Molar Maul is action video game released for the ZX Spectrum by Imagine Software in 1983. It was written in four weeks by John Gibson. 
The gameplay involves cleaning teeth in an arcade-style.

Gameplay

The playing area consists of a stylised open mouth, with teeth above and below, and a tube of toothpaste in the middle of the screen.  The player controls a small toothbrush, which is loaded with toothpaste from the tube.

A number of small creatures, collectively known as "DK" (a pun on "decay"), fly around the mouth and attack teeth at random.  Teeth are initially white, but change to progressively darker colours as they are attacked.  If a tooth turns black it is lost.  DKs are killed by contact with a loaded toothbrush, which also lightens non-black teeth.

As the game progresses, sweets appear and introduce ever-larger numbers of DK.  The game ends when all the teeth are destroyed.

See also
Tooth Invaders
Plaque Attack

References

1983 video games
Video games developed in the United Kingdom
ZX Spectrum games
ZX Spectrum-only games